Jaineck Chinyanta (born 1 August 1958) is a Zambian boxer. He competed in the men's lightweight event at the 1984 Summer Olympics.

References

1958 births
Living people
Zambian male boxers
Olympic boxers of Zambia
Boxers at the 1984 Summer Olympics
Place of birth missing (living people)
Lightweight boxers